Vizcaya station is a station on the Metrorail rapid transit service station in The Roads neighborhood of Miami, Florida. The station is located near the intersection of Southwest First Avenue and 32nd Road, at the southern terminus of I-95 at South Dixie Highway (US 1) two blocks southeast of Coral Way. 

The Vizcaya station opened May 20, 1984 and features a pedestrian bridge over the US 1/I-95 junction for access to the Vizcaya Museum and Gardens and residences east of the highway.

Station layout
The station has two tracks served by an island platform with a parking lot immediately north of the station platform.

References

External links

MDT – Metrorail Stations
 Station from Google Maps Street View

Green Line (Metrorail)
Orange Line (Metrorail)
Metrorail (Miami-Dade County) stations in Miami
Railway stations in the United States opened in 1984
1984 establishments in Florida